|}

The Celebration Stakes is a Listed flat horse race in Ireland open to thoroughbreds aged three years or older. It is run at the Curragh over a distance of 1 mile (1,609 metres), and it is scheduled to take place each year in late June or early July.

The race was first run in 1995.  It was run as a 7 furlong handicap in 2000, and was awarded Listed status in 2001. It is currently sponsored by Dubai Duty Free.

Records

Leading jockey (4 wins):
Kevin Manning – Via Verbano (1997), Union Project (1999), Citizen Edward (2000), Wexford Native (2022)

Leading trainer (6 wins):
 Aidan O'Brien – Bach (2001), Mingun (2003), Emperor Claudius (2010), Pirateer (2011), Count Of Limonade (2013), Giovanni Boldini (2014)

Winners

See also
 Horse racing in Ireland
 List of Irish flat horse races

References
Racing Post:

Flat races in Ireland
Open mile category horse races
Curragh Racecourse
Recurring sporting events established in 1995
1995 establishments in Ireland